Sporting Clube de Portugal is a Portuguese sports club based in Lisbon, founded in 1906. Sporting have won 23 championships, 17 Taça de Portugal, 2 Taça da Liga, 8 Supertaça Cândido de Oliveira, 4 Campeonato de Portugal and 1 UEFA Cup Winners' Cup.

The supporters of the club, who are called , have played an important part in the club's growth during its -year existence. One of those cases was the raising of money for the construction of the João Rocha Pavilion, when a lot of money was donated by the supporters.

Sporting has 4 ultras groups: Juventude Leonina, founded in 1976, Torcida Verde, founded in 1984, Directivo Ultras XXI, founded in 2002 and Brigada Ultras Sporting, founded in 2004.All of that ultras hate benfica and porto

Supporters groups
Sporting is the club with the oldest support group in Portugal, Juventude Leonina, and is the club with most supporters groups. They support the club not only in football, but also in futsal, handball, basketball, roller hockey, volleyball and the rest of the sports practiced in Sporting.

The support groups used to be separated at Estádio José Alvalade but, since 2013, they are together at the called "Curva sul" (south corner) of the stadium.

Juventude Leonina

Juventude Leonina is the first support group to be founded in Portugal. It was founded in 1976 by the sons of João Rocha: Gonçalo Rocha and João Rocha.

Juve Leo has more than 10000 members, and more and more ultras are getting enrolled in the world of Juve Leo. In the 80s and 90s had more than 15,000 members. After the "division" of associates, first with the departure of some elements which would found Torcida Verde and later the departure of more elements that formed the Directivo Ultras XXI, Juve Leo went through a dark moment in his history.

Juve Leo and Directivo have a friendship with the supporters of ACF Fiorentina.

In May 2018, 50 members of Juve Leo broke into Academia Sporting, among them, the former leader of Juve Leo, Fernando Mendes, and attacked some players and members of the staff, disappointed with the performance of the team.

In October 2019, the club direction terminated the protocols it had with Juve Leo and Directivo, due to the scale of violence.

The current leader of Juve Leo is Nuno Mendes (aka Mustafa).

Torcida Verde

Appeared in 1983, having at that time accepted an invitation from the Juventude Leonina to come together, due to the large number of support groups in the club. However, the experiment failed and the same would happen later when Torcida joined the Força Verde.

So, in 1984, Torcida Verde was founded. Without the club support, Torcida were always present and, inspired by the club values, supported the different teams of the club. By doing this, Sporting recognised Torcida as an official club support group in 1988.

Among the many things done by Torcida to help the club, these stand out:
 In 1991, painting of the José Alvalade Stadium in green and white, a voluntary work.
 In 1994, collaboration in the construction of the Sporting Museum.

Directivo Ultras XXI

Directivo was founded in 2002, by Vítor Santos, after the club won the championship.

DUXXI is the second biggest support group of Sporting, with more than 4000 members. Just after 1 decade, Directivo is already well known for the support in every game and for the original chants that they create.

Directivo and Juve Leo have a friendship with the supporters of ACF Fiorentina.

In October 2019, the club direction terminated the protocols it had with Juve Leo and Directivo, due to the scale of violence.

Brigada Ultras Sporting

Brigada appeared in 2004, being, at the time, fully constituted by old members of Torcida Verde, who affirmed themselves as "a group of friends with a passion for the ultra world and an eternal love for Sporting Clube de Portugal".

It is Sporting's support group with the least members, however, it continues to have many fans supporting the club around the world.

The inauguration of the new Brigada headquarters was in 2018 and was attended by well-known handball players.

References

External links

  

Sporting CP
Sporting CP
Portuguese football supporters' associations